"Adiós Granada" is song composed by :es:Tomás Barrera and Rafael Calleja, and made famous by soprano Victoria de los Angeles in 1958.

References

Spanish songs
1958 songs